Drama is the debut full-length album of Swedish indie pop musician Montt Mardié. It was released on 7 November 2005 by the Swedish record label Hybris. The album is very pop oriented, allowing many different tempos and styles to be placed next to one another. References to a girl named Annie are made throughout in more than five of the album's twelve songs.

Track listing

External links 
 

Montt Mardié albums